Sir William Essington KCB (c. 1753 – 12 July 1816) was an officer in the Royal Navy during the American War of Independence and the French Revolutionary and Napoleonic Wars.

On 15 June 1795, he was in command of Sceptre at Saint Helena. There, with the assistance of several East Indiamen, primarily the General Goddard, he captured eight Dutch East Indiamen on their way back to Europe.

Essington replaced Erasmus Gower as captain of HMS Triumph on 4 June 1797. Phillip Parker King named Port Essington, an inlet in Australia's Northern Territory, after Essington in 1803. On 23 April 1804, Essington was knighted and promoted to Rear Admiral of the Blue. He was present at the Battle of Copenhagen in 1807, flying his flag aboard . He died at Nottingham Place on 12 July 1816 at the age of 63, with the rank of vice-admiral.

References

1750s births
1816 deaths
Royal Navy vice admirals
Royal Navy personnel of the American Revolutionary War
Royal Navy personnel of the French Revolutionary Wars
Royal Navy personnel of the Napoleonic Wars
Knights Commander of the Order of the Bath